"She Loves Everybody" is a song by the band Chester French. It is the first single from their debut album Love the Future.

The single was released as an EP and featured packaging in the style of a condom wrapper, due to the themes considered in the eponymous song, in particular referencing the lyric, "she craves affection, so I use protection." The duo followed up the release up by participating in MTV's GYT (Get Yourself Tested) campaign.

Track listing
"She Loves Everybody" - 4:00
"She Loves Everybody (The Neptunes Remix)" - 3:45
"She Loves Everybody (Steve Aoki Remix)" - 3:57
"Wurlitzer Interlude" - 0:37
"Jimmy Choos" - 3:15
"Jimmy Choos (El-P Remix)" - 3:34

Charts

References

2008 songs
2009 singles
Music videos directed by Paul Hunter (director)
Chester French songs
Interscope Records singles
Futurepop songs
Neo-psychedelia songs